Voice in the Night  is a 1934 American action film directed by Charles C. Coleman and starring Tim McCoy, Billie Seward, and Joseph Crehan. It was produced as a second feature by Columbia Pictures.

Synopsis
Tim Dale, the son of the president of a telephone company, uncovers a plot by a gang who plan to have a rival telephone company fail so that they can then sell a major contract on at a huge profit to themselves.

Cast
Tim McCoy as Tim Dale
Billie Seward as Barbara Robinson
Joseph Crehan as John Robinson
Ward Bond as Bob Hall
Kane Richmond as Jack
Frank Layton as Matthews
Guy Usher as Thomas Benton
Francis McDonald as Henchman Jackson
Alphonse Ethier as W. T. Dale
 Matthew Betz as Henchman Anderson
 Milton Kibbee as 	Secretary Allen

References

External links
Voice in the Night at the Internet Movie Database

1934 films
American action films
1930s action films
Films directed by Charles C. Coleman
American black-and-white films
Columbia Pictures films
1930s American films